Tibouchina sipapoana is a species of flowering plant in the family Melastomataceae, native to Venezuela. It was first described by Henry A. Gleason in 1964.

References

sipapoana
Flora of Venezuela
Plants described in 1964